The 2012 Bucknell Bison football team represented Bucknell University in the 2012 NCAA Division I FCS football season. They were led by third-year head coach Joe Susan and played their home games at Christy Mathewson–Memorial Stadium. They are a member of the Patriot League. They finished the season 3–8, 1–5 in Patriot League play to finish in sixth place.

Schedule

References

Bucknell
Bucknell Bison football seasons
Bucknell Bison football